Mukhtar Magauin is a Kazakh writer and publicist. He was born in the district of Chubar-Tau in Semey region (now East Kazakhstan Province) of Kazakhstan on 2 February 1940. He graduated at the Kazakh state university (1962) and the doctorate (1965) there. He was head of the literary criticism department at the “Kazakh literature” newspaper in Almaty. He publishes several scholarly articles and books and novels.

When he was mentioned by the Soviet study experts in the West in the book edited by Edward Allworth as one of the nationalist Kazakh writers (1973), the local Communist rulers put his name to the “black list”. Most of his renowned uncensored novels were published only after the collapse of the Soviet Union.

He published the novels “The Yellow Kazakh” (1991), “ABC of the Kazakh History” (1993), “Dreams of Kypchaks” (2004), “The Half” 2007), etc.

In 1997, he became the winner of the International Prize for the Turkic speaking writers and culture workers and he received the prize from Suleiman Demirel, the Turkish President at that time. He is also a holder of the title of the People’s Writer of Kazakhstan.

Magauin translated several short stories and novels of the prominent foreign writers (William Somerset Maugham, Henry Rider Haggard, etc.) into Kazakh. Nowadays he lives in Prague, the Czech Republic.

External links
 https://web.archive.org/web/20110825055638/http://prstr.narod.ru/texts/num0805/arg0805.htm
 http://www.azattyk.org/content/Kazakhstan_Culture_Magauin/1950036.html

Kazakh-language writers
Turkic literature
1940 births
Living people
Al-Farabi Kazakh National University alumni
Kazakhstani emigrants to the Czech Republic